The Columbus Ohio Temple is a temple of the Church of Jesus Christ of Latter-day Saints (LDS Church) located in Columbus, Ohio, United States. It was completed and dedicated in 1999 as the church's 60th operating temple and serves church members living in 16 stakes, covering most of Ohio, but also extending into western Pennsylvania and southwestern West Virginia. The temple is in the western edge of Columbus, adjacent to Interstate 270 just north of its western junction with I-70.

History
The temple was announced by LDS Church president Gordon B. Hinckley during a visit to Columbus on April 25, 1998, with a groundbreaking held later that year on September 12. Following completion of construction in 1999, an open house was held from August 19 to 28.  The open house attracted approximately 30,000 people, including Ohio Governor Bob Taft. The temple was dedicated in six sessions by Hinckley on September 4, 1999, with approximately 11,000 members attending.

The dedication of the Columbus Ohio Temple marked the first modern LDS temple in the state and the first since the 1836 dedication of the Kirtland Temple, the first temple built by the Latter Day Saint movement. Increasing persecution and other factors led to the Kirtland Temple being mostly abandoned by 1838, after most church members moved west to Missouri, eventually relocating to Illinois in 1839 and ultimately present-day Utah in 1847. The Kirtland Temple is today a National Historic Landmark owned and operated by the Community of Christ.

The temple is one of nearly 40 that uses the Small Temple Plan. The temple in Columbus was the first of thirteen announced in 1998 using the smaller plans. It was the second such temple completed, and one of nine smaller temples dedicated in 1999 out of a total of 13 dedicated that year. The statue of the angel Moroni atop the spire was originally used on the Monticello Utah Temple and was white instead of the traditional gold. In Monticello, the white proved difficult to see on cloudy days, so the statue there was replaced with a slightly larger gold leaf statue, while the white fiberglass statue was covered in gold leaf and sent to Columbus.

In February 2013, a shooting took place in the temple's parking lot in which at least two people were injured. According to an LDS Church spokesperson, the shooting was unrelated to the temple.

Along with other LDS temples around the world, the Columbus Ohio Temple was closed in late March 2020 in response to the coronavirus pandemic. Later in March, the LDS Church announced that the temple will close for renovation on August 15, 2020, and is anticipated to reopen in late 2022.

See also

 Comparison of temples of The Church of Jesus Christ of Latter-day Saints
 List of temples of The Church of Jesus Christ of Latter-day Saints
 List of temples of The Church of Jesus Christ of Latter-day Saints by geographic region
 Temple architecture (Latter-day Saints)
 The Church of Jesus Christ of Latter-day Saints in Ohio

References

External links
 
Columbus Ohio Temple Official site
Columbus Ohio Temple at ChurchofJesusChristTemples.org

20th-century Latter Day Saint temples
The Church of Jesus Christ of Latter-day Saints in Ohio
Churches in Columbus, Ohio
Temples (LDS Church) completed in 1999
Temples (LDS Church) in the United States
1999 establishments in Ohio